Ami is a given name of Hebrew, Persian, Indian, Japanese and other origins.

Possible writing in Japanese
 亜美, "asia-beauty"
 亜海, "asia-ocean"
 亜実, "asia-truth"
 亜満, "asia-, satisfy, full"
 亜魅, "asia-fascination"
 あみ (in Hiragana)
 アミ (in Katakana)

People with the name
Ami Dolenz (born 1969), American producer television and film actress
Ami Ghia (born 1956), Indian former badminton player
Ami Kawai (born 1967), Japanese stage and television actress
Ami Harten (1947–1994), Israeli-American applied mathematician
Ami Haruna (born 1984), Japanese model and actress
, Japanese gravure idol, television personality and sportscaster
Ami James (born 1972), co-owner of tattoo parlor which is the subject of the reality television program Miami Ink
Ami Kikuchi (born 1990), Japanese gravure idol, tarento and radio presenter
Ami Koshimizu (born 1986), Japanese voice actress
Ami Maayani (born 1936), Israeli composer
Ami Mazar (born 1942), Israeli archaeologist and professor
Ami McKay (born 1968), Canadian novelist and journalist
Ami Miron, Israeli-American entrepreneur and technology developer
, Japanese ice hockey player
Ami Nakashima (born 1988), Japanese singer, dancer and actress
Ami Onuki (born 1973), Japanese pop singer
Ami Shelef (1936-1988, Israeli basketball player and coach
Ami Suzuki (born 1982), Japanese singer and songwriter
Ami Tokito (born 1987), Japanese pop singer and gravure idol
Ami Trivedi (born 1982), Indian television and theatre actress
Ami Vashi (born 1981), Indian beauty queen and model
Ami Vitale (born 1971), American photojournalist and documentary filmmaker
Ami Yoshida (born 1976), Japanese musician
Andreea Ioana Moldovan (born 1989), Romanian singer professionally known as AMI

Fictional characters
 Ami Hinamori, the younger sister of Amu Hinamori in the Shugo Chara! manga series
 Ami Kawashima, in the Toradora! light novel series
 Ami Kitajima, in the manga Digimon Next
 Ami Mizuno, one of the main characters in the original anime series of Sailor Moon including its reboot Sailor Moon Crystal 
 Ami Mori, in the online participatory webserial [https://forums.sufficientvelocity.com/threads/marked-for-death-a-rational-naruto-quest.24481/ Marked for Death] Ami Onuki, in the animated series Hi Hi Puffy AmiYumi, based on the Japanese Pop singer by the same name
 Ami, a character from the video games series Crash Bandicoot, first introduced in Crash Team Racing''

See also
 Ami (disambiguation)

Hebrew feminine given names
Indian feminine given names
Japanese feminine given names
Persian feminine given names